The following highways are/were numbered 929:

Costa Rica
 National Route 929

United States